is a Japanese screenwriter and film director.

Biography
In 1984, Hashimoto made his directorial debut with the independent film Pasokon Wars Isami, after which he began writing for television with the hit drama series Sukeban Deka.

He co-wrote the screenplays for Katsuhiro Otomo's Akira and Shinji Aoyama's EM Embalming.

Filmography

As director
 Meimon Takonishi Oendan (1987)
 CF Girl (1989)
 Lucky Sky Diamond (1990)
 Evil Dead Trap 2 (1992)
 Driving High (1993)
 Puru-puru: Tenshi Teki Kyujitsu (1993)
 Teito Monogatari Gaiden (1995)
 Kagerō 2 (1996)

As screenwriter
 Barrow Gang BC (1985)
 Sukeban Deka (1985-1987)
 Sukeban Deka The Movie (1987)
 The Drifting Classroom (1987)
 To-y (1987)
 Sukeban Deka the Movie 2: Counter-Attack from the Kazama Sisters (1988)
 Akira (1988)
 Spirit Warrior (1988)
 CF Girl (1989)
 Aoki Densetsu Shoot! (1994) 
 Kagerō 2 (1996)
 Black Jack (1996)
 Kenka Ramen (1996)
 Onna Horishi Azami (1998)
 EM Embalming (1999)
 Rinjin wa Hisoka ni Warau (1999)
 The Guys from Paradise (2001)
 Ah! Ikkenya Puroresu (2004)
 Jitensha Shounenki (2006) 
 Shamo (2007)

References

External links
 
 

Living people
1952 births
People from Shimane Prefecture
Japanese film directors
Japanese screenwriters
Akira (franchise)